The Stone: Issue Three is a limited edition live album of improvised experimental music by John Zorn, Lou Reed and Laurie Anderson  recorded at The Stone on January 10, 2008.  All proceeds from the sale of this album support The Stone.

Reception

Writing for All About Jazz, George Kanzler commented "there are some interesting, even arresting, sonic textures and overtly cinematic (soundwise) moments here, but basically this is freedom run amok".

Track listing
All compositions by Laurie Anderson, Lou Reed and John Zorn
 "Part 1" - 22:40
 "Part 2" - 13:04
 "Part 3" - 12:37

Personnel
John Zorn – alto saxophone
Lou Reed – electric guitar
Laurie Anderson – violin, electronics

References

Albums produced by John Zorn
John Zorn live albums
2008 live albums
Tzadik Records live albums